The Ottawa River drainage basin is the drainage basin in northern North America where surface water empties into the Ottawa River and adjoining waters. It accounts for about 11% of the total Saint Lawrence River drainage area.

References

Landforms of Ontario
Landforms of Quebec
Watersheds of Canada